New York State Route 383 is a north–south state highway in Monroe County, New York, United States, that was established in the early 1940s.

New York State Route 383 may also refer to:
New York State Route 383 (1930–1935) in Erie County, from NY 93 in Akron east and south to NY 5
New York State Route 383 (1935 – early 1940s) in Broome and Chenango Counties